Josephsburg is an U-Bahn station in Munich on the U2.

References

Munich U-Bahn stations
Railway stations in Germany opened in 1999